Emmanuel Yisa Orker-Jev is a Nigerian politician and a member of the Peoples Democratic Party (PDP). He defeated George Akume in the 2019 general elections for the Benue North-West Senatorial District by polling 157,726 votes to the Akume's 115,422. The total valid votes cast was 287,028 votes.

Background
Orker-Jev hails from Benue State and attended NKST Primary School from 1970 to 1976 and proceeded to Bristow Secondary School to obtain his West African Senior Certificate (WASC). He proceeded to the University of Jos 1985 to Study Law, he graduated in 1988 before he proceeded to the Nigerian Law School and was called to the Nigerian bar in 1989.

References

1963 births
Peoples Democratic Party members of the Senate (Nigeria)
Living people
21st-century Nigerian politicians
People from Benue State
University of Jos alumni
Nigerian Law School alumni